The Illinois Fighting Illini men's ice hockey team is a college ice hockey program that represents the University of Illinois at Urbana–Champaign. The Illini play on campus at historic 2,000-seat University of Illinois Ice Arena. They are a member of the American Collegiate Hockey Association (ACHA) at the ACHA Division I level. The team is a member of the Central States Collegiate Hockey League (CSCHL) within the ACHA. The team operates as a registered student organization (RSO) at the University of Illinois. The University does not currently have an NCAA varsity team, and thus the club team is the highest level of hockey offered by the University. A feasibility study published in March 2018, and commissioned by the NHL, NHLPA, and College Hockey, Inc., found a high probability of success for the hockey program to transition to NCAA Division I.  Illinois however reversed course in May 2022, announcing that they were no longer exploring adding a varsity hockey program.

History 
Organized ice hockey came to Illinois in the 1930s and played its first official season in 1937 as an independent NCAA team. The first head coach was Ray Eliot, who coached the Fightin' Illini from 1937-1939. The team went winless in the 1937–38 season, going 0–4 before winning their first game in the following season. Vic Heyliger, a former All-American at Michigan and professional player with the Chicago Blackhawks, took over as head coach for the 1939-40 season. In this second year as Illini head coach he led the team to a 17-win season, the most successful season of the Illini NCAA ice hockey team. The team recorded a 10-win season in 1941-42 and a 9-win season in 1942–43 that included only a single loss. The program was ended after the 1942–43 season during World War II; that same year in 1943 Heyliger came out of retirement for 1943–44 season to fill in the team's depleted war time roster.

The current Fighting Illini men's ice hockey team formed in the post-war era during the mid-1950s. The team joined the CSCHL in 1975, only 5 years after the league formed, making the Illini the longest on-going CSCHL members.

Facility

Notable events
 Undefeated season in 2007-2008.  Record of 38-0-0.
 2 ACHA Division I National Championships.  Won in Bensenville, Illinois in 2005.  Won in Rochester, New York in 2008.
 48 game winning streak spanning from September 28, 2007 to October 25, 2008.

Season-by-season results

Note: GP = Games played, W = Wins, L = Losses, T = Ties, Pts = Points

* Winning percentage is used when conference schedules are unbalanced.

Awards
 Big Ten Conference Championships; (3) : 1941, 1942, 1943
 ACHA National Championships; (2) : 2005, 2008
 ACHA Final Four Appearances; (10) : 1998, 2001, 2002, 2003, 2005, 2006, 2007, 2008, 2009, 2018
 ACHA National Tournament Appearances; (23) : 1993, 1994, 1995, 1998, 1999, 2000, 2001, 2002, 2003, 2004, 2005, 2006, 2007, 2008, 2009, 2010, 2012, 2013, 2014, 2015, 2016, 2017, 2018
 CSCHL Regular Season Championships; (2) : 2003, 2008, 2013
 CSCHL Tournament Championships; (6) : 1986, 1988, 1992, 2003, 2006, 2008

Fighting Illini in the NHL

Notable alumni
 Lee Archambault - U.S. Air Force colonel and NASA astronaut.  Crew member of Mission STS-117 and Commander of Mission STS-119. 
Amo Bessone - A 3-year varsity player, Bessone coached college hockey for 31 years, spending most of his career with Michigan State and led the program to its first National Championship in 1966.
 Chad Cassel - Inducted into the Illinois Hockey Hall of Fame (2007).  Winningest coach in Illini Hockey history with a record of 326-104-14.
 Gene Honda - Public address announcer for the Chicago Blackhawks.
 Tommy Karakas - Goaltender in the team's final varsity season, set a modern collegiate record for consecutive shutouts (4, since broken). Brother of Stanley Cup champion Mike Karakas.
 Norbert Sterle - Led program in scoring during the team's championship season in 1940–41. Killed while serving in World War II.

References

External links
 www.illinihockey.com

Illinois Fighting Illini ice hockey
Illinois Fighting Illini men's ice hockey
College men's ice hockey teams in the United States